Luigi Borrelli is an Italian menswear brand from  Naples, Italy. Luigi Borrelli started the company in 1957 after learning the tailoring from his mother, Anna Borrelli.

Store locations
Luigi Borrelli has flagship standalone shops in:
Forte dei Marmi
Minato-ku Tokyo

See also 
 Italian fashion
 Made in Italy

References

External links
 

Companies based in Naples
Luxury brands
Clothing brands of Italy
High fashion brands
Italian suit makers
Italian companies established in 1957
Clothing companies established in 1957
Fashion accessory brands
Menswear designers
Privately held companies of Italy
Design companies established in 1957